William John Leech (10 April 1881 – 16 July 1968) was an Irish painter.

Biography
Leech was born in Dublin the son of Anne Louisa née Garbois (1847–1921) and Professor Henry Brougham Leech LLD (1843–1921). He went to school at St Columba's College, Dublin in Rathfarnham, later studying at the Metropolitan School. He later transferred to the Royal Hibernian Academy and studied under Walter Osborne. In 1903, Leech left Dublin for Paris, where he would fall in love with the French landscape.

After he returned to Dublin from Brittany in 1906 he was soon embraced into the artistic circle of George Russell (A.E.), Constance Gore-Booth and her husband Casimir Dunin Markievicz. He exhibited nearly seventy paintings with them in a group exhibition at the Leinster Lecture Hall in August 1907. In December 1909 Leech exhibited with Jack Yeats, Albert Power, Eva Hamilton, William Orpen, Lily Williams, A.E., Constance Gore-Booth and Dermod O’Brien in the first Aonach art exhibition, organised by Sinn Féin as part of the Irish Festival at the Rotunda.

On his return to France he met and in 1912 married Saurin Elizabeth née Smith (1879–c1951), a young painter of a similar style. They separated after just two years of marriage. Leech would travel throughout  Europe and eventually settled in England in 1919, with frequent visits to the South of France, to Marseilles, Grasse and Cagnes-sur-Mer.

In about 1919 William was commissioned by a London solicitor Percy Dumville Botterell CBE (1880–1950) to paint a portrait of his wife May née Pearson (1881–1965). Percy had served as a commercial attaché to the Hague in the later years of the war and May had organised a relief center for released prisoners of war; one of these was William's brother, Lt-Col Cecil John Farran Leech (1882–1952) who made the introduction. William also painted in 1920 “Portrait of Suzanne Botterell”, Percy and May's daughter. William and May maintained a friendship and, after the deaths of Saurin Elizabeth and Percy, they married in 1953. In the last years of their lives they lived in Candy Cottage, West Clandon, Surrey.

Art Work
Leech was well known for his illustrations of Concarneau harbour. The works of Leech feature coastal and harbour scenes, landscapes, interiors, still life and portraits.

Leech at Irish Art

Notes
1.Daughter of Katherine Howard Lane and Francis Stribling Smith, born Jan 1879 in St Louis, Missouri, USA. She married first Fentress Gordon Kerlin (1864-1916), their daughter was Fentress Saurin Kerlin, (1897–1979). Katherine was the daughter of Rev. Saurin Eliot Lane (1818–1904).

References
"The Irish Impressionists, Irish Artists in France and Belgium 1850-1914". Julian Campbell. National Gallery of Ireland. 1984
http://www.mpfa.ie/Leech.htm Retrieved September 24, 2006.

An Irish Artist W. J. Leech R H A. An Introductory Guide to his artistic career. Published by Alan Denson 4 August 1968

1881 births
1968 deaths
Painters from Dublin (city)
Irish Impressionist painters